The Torneo Patagónico, commonly known as the Torneo Regional Patagonico de Rugby, is a regional rugby union competition in Argentina.

The competition started in 2008 and involves clubs from the unions of Alto Valle, Austral, Lagos del Sur and Chubut.
 
This annual tournament has traditionally been dominated by Neuquén clubs. As in other inter-provincial tournaments, such as the Torneo del Litoral or Torneo del Noroeste, the best clubs from the Torneo Patagónico qualify for the national level Torneo del Interior B.

Championships
The Torneo Patagónico includes 6 teams competing for the provincial title. All the champions are listed below:

Titles

Titles by club

References

External links
Unión de Rugby del Alto Valle
Unión de Rugby Austral

Rugby union leagues in Argentina